= Gauteng Roller Hockey League =

South African roller hockey tournament

- Sport: Roller Hockey
- No. of teams: 7
- Country: (South Africa)
- Website: Gauteng Roller Hockey League

The Gauteng Roller Hockey League is the biggest Roller Hockey Clubs Championship in South Africa.

== Participated Teams in the last Season ==
The clubs that competed in the season of 2010 are ACPP, APF JUV, União de Joanesburgo, APF, Sporting, Nucleo, Sporting B.

=== List of Winners ===
Year	Champion
2018/19	ACPP
2017/18	ACPP
2016/17	ACPP
2015/16	ACPP
2014/15	ACPP
2012/13	ACPP
2011/12	ACPP
2010/11	ACPP
2009/10	ACPP
2008/09	ACPP
2007/08	ACPP
2006/07	ACPP
2005/06	ACPP
2004/05	ACPP
2003/04	ACPP

=== Number of Championships by team ===
Team	Championships
ACPP	30
